"For the Lord reigneth" is a German Christian hymn written by Matthäus Apelles von Löwenstern in 1644. It was translated into English in 1863 by Catherine Winkworth.

Lyrics

Notes

References 

1644 works
17th-century hymns in German
German-language songs
Songs about Jesus